Jesse Powell Tower is a public housing project located in Little Rock, Arkansas. The nine-story tall building is located directly across from Arkansas Children's Hospital on 5th street. Part of the Little Rock Housing Authority's jurisdiction, the building has become notorious for its poverty and crime and has been part of the effort to clean up Little Rock's notorious south-central side, which garnered 52 murders in 2012.

External links
Jesse Powell Towers at Emporis

Buildings and structures in Little Rock, Arkansas
Modernist architecture in Arkansas
Public housing in the United States